The 1991–92 snooker season was a series of snooker tournaments played between 30 May 1991 and 31 May 1992. The following table outlines the results for ranking and the invitational events.


Calendar

Official rankings 

The top 16 of the world rankings, these players automatically played in the final rounds of the world ranking events and were invited for the Masters.

Notes

References

External links

1991
Season 1992
Season 1991